Juan Ramon Valladares (born 22 January 1947) is a Honduran long-distance runner. He competed in the men's 5000 metres at the 1968 Summer Olympics.

References

1947 births
Living people
Athletes (track and field) at the 1968 Summer Olympics
Honduran male long-distance runners
Olympic athletes of Honduras
Place of birth missing (living people)